is a railway station in the town of Naraha, Futaba District, Fukushima Prefecture, Japan, operated by the East Japan Railway Company (JR East). It was opened on 20 April 2019.

Lines served 
J-Village Station is served by the Jōban Line. It is 235.9 km from the official starting point of the Jōban Line at Nippori Station.

Station layout 
The station consists of two side platforms serving two tracks. Due to the location of the station between the tracks (which enter separate tunnels immediately north), the side platforms are positioned to resemble an island platform. The platforms are built at a length of 215m which can accommodate 10-car trains, including Limited Express services. Ramps and elevators are also available for passengers, especially wheelchair users.

The station is unmanned. The station building was constructed 170m away from the east entrance to the J-Village Stadium, facing Naraha. A 400m² plaza was built in front of the station.

History 
 28 March 2018: Construction approved by Ministry of Land, Infrastructure, Transport and Tourism.
 22 May 2018: Groundbreaking ceremony.
 11 Oct 2018: Station name finalised as J-Village Station.
 20 April 2019: Opened as a seasonal station.
 14 March 2020: The station's status was changed to become a permanent station.

See also
 J-Village Stadium

References

External links

  

Railway stations in Fukushima Prefecture
Jōban Line
Railway stations in Japan opened in 2019
Stations of East Japan Railway Company
Naraha, Fukushima